William Bebbington (19 October 1856 – 31 July 1939) was a cheese maker and member of the Queensland Legislative Assembly.

Biography
Bebbington was born at Baschurch, Salop, England, to Thomas Bebbington and his wife Martha. He worked as a clerk for the Midland Railway before arriving in Australia and settling in Toowoomba. He started a cheese factory in the town and eventually became the President of the Queensland Cheese Manufacturers' Association.

In 1881 he married Amelia Jones (died 1903) in Baschurch and together had two sons and three daughters. He died in July 1939 and was buried in the Drayton and Toowoomba Cemetery.

Political career
Bebbington was the member for Drayton in the Queensland Legislative Assembly from 1912 until 1923. During that time he represented the Ministerial Party, Farmers' Union, National Party, and an early version of what became the Country Party.

References

Members of the Queensland Legislative Assembly
1856 births
1939 deaths
Burials in Drayton and Toowoomba Cemetery
National Party (Queensland, 1917) members of the Parliament of Queensland